Ol Doinyo Eburru is an active complex of volcanoes in the Great Rift Valley, Kenya to the northwest of Lake Naivasha.
It is being exploited for geothermal energy.
Soysambu Conservancy is located to the north of the massif, between Lake Elmenteita to the east and Lake Nakuru to the west.

Geology

Eburru is part of a group of volcanoes in the rift that also includes Suswa, Longonot, Olkaria, Elmenteita and Menengai.
It is separated from Olkaria volcano to the south by the Akira plains.
In this part of the rift, the eastern margin is covered by trachytic tuffs, often ignimbritic, and some trachytic lavas. The western margin is covered by trachytic and pantelleritic pumice as well as deposits of ash falls ejected from Eburru.

It developed in three stages. The products of the first stage, in the west, are now mostly buried apart from small pantelleritic lava outcrops. The second stage formed the  Waterloo Ridge on the eastern side of the massif. These rocks came from a series of pyroclastic eruptions originating in a fault zone.
The third stage created craters, small cones, domes and lava flows. The pumice lapilli and ash beds from these centers covers most of the massif as well as the western shoulder of the rift. The youngest formations are no more than a few hundred years old.

The Eburru massif today is ridge-shaped and eroded, with an east–west orientation.
There are two summits, Eburru hill and West hill.
There are young craters on the eastern part of the ridge.
The east flank has rhyolitic domes that were probably created in the Holocene and are still only partly overgrown with vegetation. There are widespread fumaroles in cinder cones and craters along the faults in the massif.

Geothermal development

In October 2009 Geothermal Development Associates announced that they had signed a contract with Kenya Electricity Generating Company Limited to design, supply and commission a wellhead geothermal power plant at Eburru.
The plant would include a 2.5 MW steam turbine generator manufactured by Elliott Turbomachinery in Jeannette, Pennsylvania.
It has been estimated that Eburru could support a 20 MW geothermal power station.

References

Sources

Volcanoes of Kenya
Mountains of Kenya
Great Rift Valley
Landforms of Rift Valley Province
Nakuru County
Active volcanoes
Quaternary Africa
Complex volcanoes